Mamon is a Czech thriller drama television series, that premiered on HBO Europe in October 2015. It was filmed by director Vladimír Michálek with cameraman Martin Štrba based on a script by Štefan Titka based on a Norwegian novel of the same name. It premiered from 25 October to 29 November 2015.

The series won the Czech Lion in the category of best drama TV series.

The main slogan of the series is the sentence You will find the truth between the lines.

Cast
Matěj Hádek as Petr Vlček
Eva Leimbergerová as Stella Němečková
Michal Dlouhý as Daniel Vlček
Gabriela Míčová as	Eva Vlčková
Daniel Tůma as	Michal Vlček
Pavlína Štorková as Journalist Marie Králová
Tereza Hofová as prosecutor Jana Skálová
Igor Bareš as Aleš Toman
Petr Halberstadt as cleaner
Jiří Vyorálek as Samuel Pleva
Igor Ondříček as Ing. Karel Zpěváček
Kateřina Burianová as Anna Vlčková
Vladimír Krátký as Antonín Vlček
Ondřej Malý as minister Theodor Horváth
Petra Jungmanová as Ivona Palcová
Petr Motloch as Jan Šrámek st.
Stanislav Gerstner as investigator Stach
Pavel Gajdoš as Břetislav Málek
Jan Novotný as director Doubrava
Martin Sitta as Josef Uher
Jakub Koudela as Jan Šrámek ml.

References

External links

2010s Czech television series
Czech drama television series
Czech thriller television series
2015 Czech television series debuts
HBO Europe original programming
Czech-language HBO original programming
Czech Lion Awards winners (television series)
Czech television series based on non-Czech television series